Hall Township is one of twelve townships in Dubois County, Indiana. As of the 2010 census, its population was 1,281 and it contained 489 housing units.

Geography

Unincorporated towns
 Celestine
 Ellsworth
(This list is based on USGS data and may include former settlements.)

Adjacent townships
 Columbia Township (north)
 Jackson Township, Orange County (northeast)
 Patoka Township, Crawford County (east)
 Jefferson Township (south)
 Jackson Township (southwest)
 Marion Township (west)

Major highways
  Indiana State Road 164

Cemeteries
The township contains two cemeteries: Adkins and Bailey.

References
 
 United States Census Bureau cartographic boundary files

External links
 Indiana Township Association
 United Township Association of Indiana

Townships in Dubois County, Indiana
Jasper, Indiana micropolitan area
Townships in Indiana